Veau is a surname. Notable people with the surname include:

Francesco Veau (1727–1768), Italian Baroque painter
Guillaume Veau, 13th-century French trouvère